Mullanwali is a town and Union Council of Bhakkar District in the Punjab province of Pakistan. It is part of Bhakkar Tehsil and is located at 31°32'36N 71°4'60E with an altitude of 154 metres (508 feet).

References

Union councils of Bhakkar District